Fabio Perna (born 30 September 1986) is an Italian professional footballer who plays as a forward for  club Giana Erminio.

Club career
Perna started his career on Promozione clubs. He joined to Eccellenza club Sancolombano for the 2009–10 season.

Perna joined to Giana Erminio in the 2012–13 Promozione season, and won the promotion with the team to Serie D, and to the Serie C the next year.

The forward made his debut in Serie C on 5 September 2014 against Lumezzane.

References

External links
 
 

1986 births
Living people
Footballers from Milan
Italian footballers
Association football forwards
Serie C players
Serie D players
Eccellenza players
Promozione players
A.S. Giana Erminio players